These are the results of the men's C-2 500 metres competition in canoeing at the 2004 Summer Olympics.  The C-2 event is raced by two-man sprint canoes.

Medalists

Heats
The 14 teams first raced in two heats on August 24.  The top three finishers from each of the heats advanced directly to the final, and the remaining 8 teams moved on to the semifinal.

Semifinal
The top three finishers in the semifinal (raced on August 26) advanced to the final, joining the six teams who had moved directly from the heats.  All other teams were eliminated.

Final
The final was held on August 28.

The Chinese duo had just won their first World Cup races weeks earlier and were only looking to gain experience for the next Summer Olympics in Beijing. The race was so close that race officials could not determine the winners until most of the canoers were out of their boats and the canoes were on the dock.

References
2004 Summer Olympics Canoe sprint results 
Sports-reference.com 2004 C-2 500 m results.
Wallechinsky, David and Jamie Loucky (2008). "Canoeing: Men's Canadian Pairs 500 Meters". In The Complete Book of the Olympics: 2008 Edition. London: Aurum Press Limited. p. 482.
Yahoo! Sports Athens 2004 Summer Olympics Canoe/Kayak Results

Men's C-2 0500
Men's events at the 2004 Summer Olympics